Zeleny or Zelenyi (in  or , meaning "green")  is a surname. The feminine form is Zelena (in ). The Russian-language equivalent is Zelyony, sometimes transliterated as Zeliony.  Notable people with this surname include:

People
 Charles Zeleny (1878-1939), Czech-American zoologist and professor at the University of Illinois
 Charlie Zeleny, American metal rock drummer
 Daniell Zeleny, Australian footballer
 Jaroslav Zelený, Czech footballer
 Jeff Zeleny, Pulitzer Prize-winning Czech-American journalist for CNN and the New York Times
 John Zeleny (1872-1951), Czech-American physicist at the University of Minnesota, inventor of the Zeleny electroscope
 Jindřich Zelený (1922-1997), Czech philosopher
 Josef Zelený (1824-1886), Moravian artist
 Lawrence Zeleny (1904-1995, American biochemist and ornithologist, founder of North American Bluebird Society
 Lev Zeleny, Russian physicist
 Milan Zeleny (born 1942), American economist
 Sylvia Aguilar Zéleny (born 1973), Mexican novelist
 Václav Zelený, Czech botanist

See also
 
 Danylo Ilkovych Terpylo, Ukrainian warlord and pogromist, known as Zelenyy.

Czech-language surnames